Philippe Francq (born 13 December 1961) is a Belgian comic book artist, best known for the series Largo Winch.

Biography
Philippe Francq was born in Etterbeek in 1961. He was since his youth an ardent comic reader, who grew up with the comics from Tintin magazine from the 1950s. His early favourites were Blake and Mortimer, Spike and Suzy, Alix and The Adventures of Tintin. He finished studying comic drawing at the Saint Luc Academy in Brussels when he was 23.

After some minor success with Des villes et des femmes and Léo Tomasini (both at Dargaud), he met author Jean Van Hamme, then already one of the most successful European comic authors with Thorgal and XIII, in 1988. Van Hamme offered Francq a comic based on some novels he had written ten years earlier, and this was in 1990 the basis for the series Largo Winch. Since then, this as well has become an extremely successful series, with initial sales of over 600,000 copies per album in French alone, and is now the only series Francq makes anymore, at a rate of one album a year. Philippe Francq lives in the South of France.

Bibliography

Awards
1992: Nominated for Best Cover and Best Long Comic strip at the Haxtur Awards, Spain
1994: Best Drawing at the Haxtur Awards
1996: Best Long Comic Strip at the Haxtur Awards
2003: Nominated for the Audience Award at the Angoulême International Comics Festival, France
2004: Nominated for Best Long Comic Strip at the Haxtur Awards
2006: Nominated for the Audience Award at the Angoulême International Comics Festival

Notes

References
 
 Béra, Michel; Denni, Michel; and Mellot, Philippe (2002): "Trésors de la Bande Dessinée 2003–2004". Paris, Les éditions de l'amateur. 

1961 births
Living people
People from Etterbeek